An engineering geologist is a geologist trained in the discipline of engineering geology. Many organizations and governments have programs for the qualification, testing and certification of engineering geologists as a protection to the public. 

Engineering geologists commonly work with civil engineers, structural engineers, architects, developers and planners, to ensure that the geologic factors affecting the location, design, construction, operation and maintenance of engineering works are recognized and adequately accounted for.

One of the earliest definitions of the "Engineering Geologist" or "Professional Engineering Geologist" was provided by the Executive Committee of the Division on Engineering Geology of the Geological Society of America in 1951, as follows:

A professional engineering geologist is a person who, by reason of his special knowledge of the geological sciences and the principles and methods of engineering analysis and design acquired by professional education or practical experience, is qualified to apply such special knowledge for the purpose of rendering professional services or accomplishing creative work such as consultation, investigation, planning, design or supervision of construction for the purpose of assuring that the geologic elements affecting the structures, works or projects are adequately treated by the responsible engineer.

One of the most important roles of the engineering geologist is the interpretation of landforms and earth processes to identify potential geologic and related manmade hazards that may impact civil structures and human development.  Nearly all engineering geologists are initially trained and educated in geology, primarily during their undergraduate education.  This background in geology provides the engineering geologist with an understanding of how the earth works, which is crucial in mitigating earth related hazards.  Most engineering geologists also have graduate degrees where they have gained specialized education and training in soil mechanics, rock mechanics, geotechnics, groundwater, hydrology, and civil design.  These two aspects of the engineering geologists' education provides them with a unique ability to understand and mitigate hazards associated with earth-structure interactions.

In the states of California, Oregon, and Washington, the title of Engineering Geologist is legally protected by state registration boards.  In California and Oregon, the licensure title is Certified Engineering Geologist, and in Washington it is Licensed Engineering Geologist.  These are higher-level licenses and you must first become a Professional Geologist or Registered Geologist.  The 2007 California Building Code (=CCR Title 24) specifies the title of Certified Engineering Geologist for the practice of engineering geology.  As of 2009, there are about 1,600 Certified Engineering Geologists in California, and as of 2013 there are about 270 Certified Engineering Geologists in Oregon and 640 Licensed Engineering Geologists in Washington.

References 
 Bates and Jackson, 1980, Glossary of Geology: American Geological Institute.
 The Heritage of Engineering Geology: the First Hundred Years: Geological Society of America, GSA Centennial Special Volume 3, 1991.

See also 
 Engineering geology
 Geologic preliminary investigation
 Geotechnics
 Soil mechanics
 Rock mechanics
 Geotechnical engineering
 Geotechnical investigation

Geotechnical engineers